Solukhumbu District (Sherpa: , Wylie: shar khum bu dzong) is one of 14 districts of Province No. 1 of eastern Nepal. As the name suggests, it consists of the subregions Solu and Khumbu.

Mount Everest is in the northern part of this district, within Sagarmatha National Park.

History
Historically, Solukhumbu was part of Kirata Kingdoms in early and medieval era. It was a part of Majh Kirat Khambuwan (central province or region of Kirat Kingdoms).

Before the unification of Nepal by king of Gorkha, what is now Solukhumbu district was part of Chaudandi of Majh Kirat (Khambuwan). In 1773 AD the King of Gorkha attacked and absorbed it into Nepal.

The Solukhumbu district was established in 1962 carving out the old East No. 3 district. Before 1962 present Solukhumbu, Okhaldhunga and some parts of Khotang previously were one district "East No. 3". Solu and Rawa thums (counties) were carved out from East No. 3 to create Solukhumbu District.

Geography and climate
Solukhumbu is a Himalayan district of Province No. 1 of Nepal, situated on the north-west corner of the province. It is one of three Himalayan districts of Province No. 1. It is situated between Lat. 27°20'39" to 28°6'24" North and Long. 86°0'21" to 87°0'1" East. The district is surrounded by Sankhuwasabha in east, Bhojpur in south-east, Khotang and Okhaldhunga in south, Bagmati Province in west and Tibet (China) in north.

The extremely diverse geography of Solukhumbu district can be categorized in three levels:

Khumbu Himal (Highland mountains)
Mahalangur and other Himalayan mountain ranges are located in this section. This section is located on the northern border with Tibet. Mount Everest (8,848m), Lhotse (8,516m), Makalu (8,485m), Cho Oyu (8,201m), Gyachung Kang (7,952m) etc. are some of the world's highest mountains in this range.

Khumbu region (Highland valley)
Khumbu valley is the highland region which is famous worldwide for trekking and hiking. Kulung and Sherpa are the main inhabitants in this region. Khumbu Pasanglhamu is the administrative division in this region. It includes the town of Namche Bazaar as well as the villages of Thame, Khumjung, Pangboche, Pheriche and Kunde. The famous Buddhist monastery at Tengboche is also located in the Khumbu.

Solu region (Mid-hills)
Lower Solukhumbu (lower parts of Solukhumbu District) is part of the Mid-hills region. It is less famous for trekking, however new trails such as the Mundhum trail are being developed. Rais are the main inhabitants in this region.

Administrative divisions
Solukhumbu is divided into 8 local level units, 1 unit is urban and 7 are rural. They are further divided into wards. Solukhumbu is single-seat constituency for parliamentary constituency and double seat for provincial constituency. Solukhumbu district coordination committee coordinates between local and provincial governments. Solukhumbu district administration office co-operates with Solukhumbu DCC to maintain peace, order and security in the district. The officer of District Administration office called CDO.

Former divisions (1990–2016)
Formerly, Solukhumbu district was divided into many Village development committees. In 2014 Dudhkunda municipality was established merging some Village development committees. In 2016 all other Village development committee nullified and introduced rural municipality thus all former Village development committees grouped into 7 units and announced 7 rural municipality.

There were 35 Village Development Committees in Solukhumbu District:

Demographics
At the time of the 2011 Nepal census, Solukhumbu District had a population of 105,886. Of these, 36.7% spoke Nepali, 16.7% Sherpa, 9.4% Tamang, 9.2% Kulung, 8.8% Thulung, 8.5% Khaling, 3.8% Nachhiring, 2.4% Bahing, 1.5% Magar, 0.7% Maithili, 0.6% Newar, 0.4% Rai, 0.2% Sunuwar, 0.1% Bhujel, 0.1% Gurung, 0.1% Tharu, 0.1% Tibetan and 0.4% other languages as their first language.

In terms of ethnicity/caste, 19.7% were Rai, 16.6% Sherpa, 15.0% Chhetri, 9.9% Tamang, 8.9% Kulung, 5.6% Kami, 4.9% Magar, 4.6% Hill Brahmin, 3.5% Nachhiring, 2.4% Newar, 1.9% Gharti/Bhujel, 1.5% Damai/Dholi, 1.0% Thulung, 0.7% Gurung, 0.7% Sanyasi/Dasnami, 0.5% Sarki, 0.3% Kalar, 0.3% Khaling, 0.3% Sunuwar, 0.1% Badi, 0.1% Bahing, 0.1% Hajam/Thakur, 0.1% Koiri/Kushwaha, 0.1% Majhi, 0.1% Tharu and 0.5% others.

In terms of religion, 40.2% were Hindu, 30.2% Kirati, 27.2% Buddhist, 2.2% Christian, 0.1% Prakriti and 0.2% others.

In terms of literacy, 64.0% could read and write, 3.2% could only read and 32.8% could neither read nor write.

Notable people
Tenzing Norgay- First ascent of Mount Everest
 Pasang Lhamu Sherpa - First Nepalese female ascent 
Babu Chiri Sherpa - 10 times ascent Mount Everest
Ang Dorje Sherpa - 19 times ascent Mount Everest
Apa Sherpa - 21 times ascent Mount Everest
 Nawang Sherpa - First person to climb Mount Everest with a prosthetic leg

See also
Zones of Nepal

References

 
Districts of Nepal established in 1962
Districts of Koshi Province
Tibetan Buddhist places